Kalle Stropp och Grodan Boll räddar Hönan is a 1987 Swedish animated short film directed by Jan Gissberg about the two eponymous characters created by Thomas Funck. Funck also provides all voices. The film was released theatrically in Sweden on 12 December 1987. It was followed in 1991 by the feature-length film Charlie Strapp and Froggy Ball Flying High, made by the same team.

Plot 
One day, Charlie Strapp's good friend The Chicken is kidnapped by two villains Pudding and Karlsson. Charlie Strapp, who has just been invited by Froggy Ball to get in his new car, constructed by Sheet-Niklas and himself mainly out of an old shoe and a well-shaken soda bottle, begins the chase. But the start is miserable as their other friend The Parrot also ends up being kidnapped. It turns out, though, that the kidnappers might not be purely evil after all: they work as stage magicians and just happen to need a hen for a trick they are performing. Charlie Strapp and the others continue to chase the kidnappers through air, on the ground and on water skis until the final showdown. Maybe they can find another trick.

Cast 
 Thomas Funck-Charlie Strapp, Froggy Ball, The Parrot (Polly The Parrot), Sheet-Niklas (Tin-Can Harry), The Fox (Phil The Fox), Pudding, Karlsson, and The Chicken

Production
TBA

Reception
TBA

References

External links 

Swedish children's films
Swedish animated films
Swedish short films
1987 films
Films based on radio series
1987 animated films
1980s animated short films
1980s Swedish films